Richard Belvin (born 26 August 1941) is a Bermudian competitive sailor. He competed at the 1968 Summer Olympics in Acapulco, in the dragon class. He also competed in the 1972 Summer Olympics in Kiel, in the dragon and the 1976 Summer Olympics in Kingston, Ontario, in the Soling. Belvin also finished third in the 1967 Pan American Games Snipe (with Penny Simmons). He was born in Paget, Bermuda.

References

External links
 

1941 births
Living people
Bermudian male sailors (sport)
Olympic sailors of Bermuda
Pan American Games bronze medalists for Bermuda
Pan American Games medalists in sailing
People from Paget Parish
Sailors at the 1968 Summer Olympics – Dragon
Sailors at the 1972 Summer Olympics – Dragon
Sailors at the 1976 Summer Olympics – Soling
Sailors at the 1967 Pan American Games
Snipe class sailors
Medalists at the 1967 Pan American Games